The Vice and Virtue Ministry is the second album by The Happy Bullets. The album's name is a fictional British prep school that spoofs the name of a former Taliban governmental department, the Vice and Virtue Ministry.

Track listing 
All tracks written by Jason Roberts and Tim Ruble

Learning to Love the Factory – 3:13
The Vice and Virtue Ministry – 3:28
Drinkin' on the Job – 3:34
Mr. Gray – 3:31
The Disquieting Letter – 2:33
If You Were Mine – 2:59
A Momentary Vision of the End of the World as Seen Through the Eyes of a Suburban Housewife – 4:17
A Proper Rifle Assembly – 4:15
Don't Wait Up – 3:29
Weights and Measures – 3:19
Sex and Valium – 1:54
Good Day! – 2:31

2005 albums
Indie pop albums by American artists
Fictional schools